Pedro Rendón (born 27 April 1941) is an Ecuadorian gymnast. He competed in seven events at the 1968 Summer Olympics.

References

1941 births
Living people
Ecuadorian male artistic gymnasts
Olympic gymnasts of Ecuador
Gymnasts at the 1968 Summer Olympics
Sportspeople from Guayaquil